DeLundon (born DeLundon Jimel Spearman on July 10, 1987 in Chicago, Illinois), also known as D-Lo, the D.L.O. and Hollywood Nicky is a hip hop recording artist, record producer and owner/founder of DeLu3.0LLC. DeLundon released a full-length studio album called The Demonstration in 2007. DeLundon will release a new album late 2010 via Tunecore. Styled as the arch villain of hip hop. DeLundon expresses Intrigue with the duality of good in evil; he lyrically weaves these themes in his music with a distinct delivery. As a producer he describes his music as out of body. His production style is equivalent to a 2012 version of Phil Spector. Experimenting with multiple unrelated abstract mediums and fusing them together to create a hip-hop wall of sound. In early 2012 DeLundon teamed up with Chicago producer Angelbeatz, to form the hip hop group, Angel/DeLundon, and the corresponding music group: Angelbeatz/DeLu3.0.

Discography 
 In Black and White - 2004 (unreleased)
 The Demonstration - 2007
 DeLundon - 2011
 Baker's Street w/Angelbeatz-2012
 Convert or Die w/Angelbeatz- 2013

References 

1987 births
Living people
Rappers from Chicago
21st-century American rappers